Geode State Park is a state park of Iowa, USA, border  Henry County and Des Moines County It is managed by the Iowa Department of Natural Resources. While it is named for Iowa's state rock, the geode, few can be found in the park. A display of geodes, with their mysterious crystal formations in their hollow cavities, can be seen at the park office. It is illegal to remove geodes from state parks.

The prime attraction of the 1,640-acre park is Lake Geode, a 187-acre lake built in 1950. Over the years, the lake has become well known for excellent fishing for largemouth bass, bluegill, crappie, channel catfish, bullhead, red-eared sunfish.

Geode State Park joined the Iowa park system in 1937. The spot along the Skunk River had long been a local picnicking spot. Originally local groups raised $4,800 to purchase 143 acres.  The Civilian Conservation Corps moved onto the grounds to begin clearing trees, creating roads and building structures. In 1947, civilian construction workers returned and building resumed. In 1951, the lake, beach and CCC-reminiscent beach house were dedicated. Also opened at the time was an airstrip, making Geode the only park that invited travelers to arrive by private plane. The strip has been closed since.

On Saturday, July 25, 2009, a RAGBRAI participant, Donald D. Myers from Rolla, Missouri, died from injuries sustained in a crash at the bottom of the hill near Geode Lake dam at Geode State Park.

Some places in the area have been reported to have timber rattlesnakes.

The park can be reached from Middletown on Iowa 79 or from Lowell on County Road J-20.

References

External links

Geode State Park

State parks of Iowa
Protected areas of Henry County, Iowa
National Register of Historic Places in Henry County, Iowa
Civilian Conservation Corps in Iowa
Park buildings and structures on the National Register of Historic Places in Iowa